The Pitchfork Music Festival 2017 was held on July 14 to 16, 2017 at the Union Park, Chicago, United States. The festival was headlined by LCD Soundsystem, Solange and A Tribe Called Quest. The festival marked A Tribe Called Quest's first full live concert since the death of founding member Phife Dawg.

Lineup
Headline performers are listed in boldface. Artists listed from latest to earliest set times.

Notes

References

External links

2017 music festivals
Pitchfork Music Festival